is a town located in Miyagi Prefecture, Japan. , the town had an estimated population of 33,459, and a population density of 450 persons per km² in 12,643 households.

Geography
Watari is located in the Tōhoku region of northern Japan, in the southeastern Miyagi Prefecture, bordered by the Pacific Ocean to the east. The Abukuma River flows through the town, forming its western border.

Neighboring municipalities
Miyagi Prefecture
Iwanuma
Kakuda
Yamamoto
Shibata

Climate
Watari has a humid climate (Köppen climate classification Cfa) characterized by mild summers and cold winters.

Demographics
Per Japanese census data, the population of Watari has remained relatively steady since the turn of the 21st century.

History
The area of present-day Watari was part of ancient Mutsu Province, and the place name of “Watari” appears in the Shoku Nihongi chronicles dated 718 AD. It was part of the holdings of Sendai Domain under the Edo period Tokugawa shogunate.

Watari Town was established on April 1, 1889 with the establishment of the post-Meiji restoration modern municipalities system. It merged with the neighboring town of Arahama and villages of Yoshida and Õkuma on February 1, 1955.

Watari was severely damaged by a tsunami caused by an earthquake on 11 March 2011. Hundreds of people were stranded in a school but were airlifted from the roof by Japanese military helicopters. The tsunami covered 47% of the town's area and 305 residents were reported killed or missing.

Government
Watari has a mayor-council form of government with a directly elected mayor and a unicameral town council of 18 members.  Watari contributes one seat to the Miyagi Prefectural legislature. In terms of national politics, the town is part of Miyagi 3rd district of the lower house of the Diet of Japan.

Economy
The economy of Watari is largely based on agriculture (strawberries) and commercial fishing and fish processing.

Education
Watari has six public elementary schools and four public middle schools operated by the town government, and one public high school operated by the Miyagi Prefectural Board of Education.

Transportation

Railway
 East Japan Railway Company (JR East) - Jōban Line
 -  -

Highway
  – Torinoumi Interchange and Parking Area – Watari Interchange
  – Watari Interchange

Local attractions
Sanjūsangendō Kanga ruins, Heian period National Historic Site
Watari Jinja (site of Watari Castle)

References

External links

Official Website 

 
Towns in Miyagi Prefecture
Populated coastal places in Japan